Tufani Saroj (born 2 July 1956) is an Indian politician in 13th and 14th Lok Sabha from Saidpur, Ghazipur and 15th Lok Sabha from MachhliShahr, Jaunpur district of Uttar Pradesh, India. He represents the MachhliShahr Constituency in Jaunpur district of Uttar Pradesh, India and is a Member of Samajwadi Party.

Early life and education
Tufani Saroj was born 2 July 1956 in Jaunpur District of Uttar Pradesh to his father Jangi and mother Mulana Devi. He married Munni Devi on 8 May 1986. They have four daughters and a son. He attended Baldeo Degree College, Baragaon, Varanasi for Bachelor of Arts.

Political career

Tufani Saroj is a Member of the Samajwadi Party and has won the 1999, 2004 & 2009 Indian general Elections from the Saidpur, Ghazipur and Machhlishahr, Jaunpur (Lok Sabha constituency) on Samajwadi Party ticket.

In 16th Loksabha (2014) Elections, Samajwadi Party again made him its candidate from Machhali Shahar (Lok Sabha Constituency). He contested election but lost in Narendra Modi wave, he lost to Bhartiya Janta Party Ram Charitra Nishad and stood on third with 1, 91 ,387 (19.18℅) votes.

Posts Held

See also
 Official biographical sketch in Parliament of India website
 http://loksabhaph.nic.in/Members/memberbioprofile.aspx?mpsno=401&lastls=13
 http://loksabhaph.nic.in/Members/memberbioprofile.aspx?mpsno=401&lastls=14
 http://loksabhaph.nic.in/Members/memberbioprofile.aspx?mpsno=401&lastls=15

References 

Living people
Politicians from Varanasi
India MPs 2004–2009
Samajwadi Party politicians
Lok Sabha members from Uttar Pradesh
India MPs 1999–2004
People from Jaunpur district
India MPs 2009–2014
People from Ghazipur district
1956 births
Uttar Pradesh MLAs 2022–2027